Alopen (also "Aleben", "Aluoben", "Olopen," "Olopan," or "Olopuen") is the first recorded Assyrian Christian missionary to have reached China, during the Tang dynasty. He was a missionary from the Church of the East (also known as the "Nestorian Church"), and probably a Syriac speaker from the Sasanian Empire or from Byzantine Syria. He is known exclusively from the Xi'an Stele, which describes his arrival in the Tang capital of Chang'an in 635 and his acceptance by Emperor Taizong of Tang. His is the earliest known name that can be attached to the history of the Church of the East in China.

History

Alopen's name is known only from the Chinese of the Xi'an Stele. This may be a transliteration of the Semitic "Abraham" or aloho punoya, "the conversion of God." According to the Stele, Alopen and his fellow missionaries came to China from Daqin (or Ta Tsin – the Byzantine Empire) in the ninth year of Emperor Taizong (Tai Tsung; 635), bringing sacred books and images. He would have come to China via the Silk Road. The Church of the East mission benefited from Taizong's policy of religious tolerance, which reversed measures his father Gaozu had taken against Buddhism and other foreign religions and influences.

According to the Stele, Taizong welcomed Alopen and arranged for the translation of the holy writings he had brought with him at the Imperial Library. Upon studying them, Taizong, a great scholar and patron, found them most acceptable and arranged for their dissemination. Indeed, four documents from the early period of Christianity in China date to around Alopen's time. Three years later, in 638, Taizong issued an official declaration protecting the Church of the East. He erected China's first Christian church and recognized twenty-one priests, likely all Persians, to administer it. Under Taizong's son and successor Gaozong, who continued this policy of toleration, Alopen's status expanded even further, and he was appointed bishop over the many churches built by the emperor.

After Alopen's time, the Church of the East was prominent in China for the remainder of the Tang Dynasty's power. Different emperors treated it differently, with some showing it the tolerance it received in the early decades, and some openly persecuting it. Church of the East disappeared with the fall of the Tang Dynasty in the early 10th century. It did not return for three centuries, when it was reintroduced by the Mongols. The story of Alopen became prominent again in the 17th century, when the Xi'an Stele was rediscovered and the Chinese were surprised to find that the "new" religion being preached by the missionaries, had actually been in existence in China more than 1,000 years earlier.

See also
 Adam (monk)

References

External links
Early Christianity in China
Samuel Hugh Moffett, "Alopen," Biographical Dictionary of Chinese Christianity.

Christian missionaries in China
Church of the East in China
Year of birth missing
Year of death missing
7th-century bishops of the Church of the East
History of Christianity in Asia
Medieval Christian clergy
Middle Eastern diaspora
Place of birth unknown